The Eagles are an American rock band. Since their debut in 1972, they have released seven studio albums, three live albums, 11 compilation albums, as well as four video albums and 30 singles. Of those singles, five topped the Billboard Hot 100. The Eagles have a total of 18 Top 40 hits on the pop charts, as well as several hits on the adult contemporary chart. They are one of the best-selling popular music artists in history.

Their highest-selling studio album is 1976's Hotel California, which was certified 26× Platinum by the Recording Industry Association of America. The album's title track was their fourth Number One single on the pop charts, as well as their highest certified single, being certified Platinum. The Eagles also hold the distinction of releasing the highest-selling album of the 20th century in the United States.  The band's compilation album Their Greatest Hits (1971–1975) sold more than 26 million copies domestically from its release until the end of 1999.

In 2007, the Eagles issued a full length studio album of new material for the first time in nearly 30 years with Long Road Out of Eden. The album debuted at number one on several charts around the world; including Norway and the United Kingdom. The album featured five consecutive Top 40 singles on the adult contemporary charts, and was certified 7× Platinum in the US.

Albums

Studio albums

Live albums

Compilation albums

Singles

Billboard Year-End performances

Other charted songs

Other appearances

Videography

Videos/DVDs

Music videos

References

Country music discographies
Discography
Discographies of American artists
Rock music group discographies